Little Sugar Creek is a stream in northwestern Benton County, Arkansas and southwestern McDonald County, Missouri. It is a tributary of the Elk River.

The headwaters of the stream arise in northeast Benton County just southeast of Garfield (at ). The stream flows west crossing under U.S. Route 62 west of Brightwater and Arkansas routes 94 and 72 south of Pea Ridge. The stream turns to the northwest and flows parallel to U.S. Route 72 through the Bella Vista area to enter Missouri at the community of Caverna. In Missouri the stream flows northwest passing under Missouri Route 90. The stream passes the community of Havenhurst and reaches its confluence with Big Sugar Creek to form the Elk River just south of Pineville. At Pineville, the creek measures approximately 224 cubic feet per second. Ironically, this stream is actually larger than the so-called "Big" Sugar Creek (see Big Sugar Creek for its discharge).

References

Rivers of Missouri
Rivers of Arkansas
Bodies of water of the Ozarks
Rivers of Benton County, Arkansas
Rivers of McDonald County, Missouri